Witta Pohl ( Breipohl; 1 November 1937 – 4 April 2011) was a German actress.

Life 
Born in the East Prussian city of Königsberg, she was one of six children to Wilhelm Breipohl, a gynaecologist, and his wife Marie-Luise, née Klönne.

During World War II, her family moved to Bielefeld, where Pohl grew up. After working as a beautician, she attended drama school in Berlin to become a stage actress.

Her most popular role however was that of "Vera Drombusch" in the highly successful
television drama series Diese Drombuschs from 1983 to 1994.

She died from leukemia in Hamburg in 2011 aged 73.

Selected filmography 
 Supermarket (1974)
Desperado City (1981)
Kudenow (1981, TV film)
Diese Drombuschs (TV series, 1983–1994)

External links 
 
 Stern:Witta Pohl ist tot (german)
 Sueddeutsche:Zum Tod von Witta Pohl (german)

German television actresses
Actors from Königsberg
1937 births
2011 deaths
German film actresses
20th-century German actresses
21st-century German actresses
Deaths from cancer in Germany
Recipients of the Cross of the Order of Merit of the Federal Republic of Germany